John H. Klausmeier is an American crew chief in NASCAR currently employed at Stewart-Haas Racing, serving as the crew chief for their No. 14 Ford Mustang in the NASCAR Cup Series, driven by Chase Briscoe.

He made his crew chiefing debut in an interim role in the summer Pocono race in 2016 for Kurt Busch, which he won. He also served as Kurt Busch’s interim crew chief in 2017. He has served as Aric Almirola's crew chief since 2018. Klausmeier became Busch's interim crew chief in 2016 following the suspension of his original crew chief, Tony Gibson. Klausmeier also works as a race engineer for the team.

References

Living people
1981 births
NASCAR crew chiefs
People from Baltimore County, Maryland